Slaveykov Peak is the sharp peak rising to 1760 m in Imeon Range on Smith Island in the South Shetland Islands, Antarctica.  The feature is situated 2 km southwest of the summit Mount Foster, to which it is linked by Zavet Saddle, 1.12 km north-northeast of Neofit Peak, 2.4 km east of Lakatnik Point and 3.45 km northwest of Ivan Asen Point.  Overlooking Armira Glacier to the southeast and Bistra Glacier to the north.  Bulgarian mapping in 2009.

The peak is named after the prominent Bulgarian poet and pamphleteer Petko Slaveykov (1827–1895).

See also
 Imeon Range
 List of Bulgarian toponyms in Antarctica

Maps
Chart of South Shetland including Coronation Island, &c. from the exploration of the sloop Dove in the years 1821 and 1822 by George Powell Commander of the same. Scale ca. 1:200000. London: Laurie, 1822.
  L.L. Ivanov. Antarctica: Livingston Island and Greenwich, Robert, Snow and Smith Islands. Scale 1:120000 topographic map. Troyan: Manfred Wörner Foundation, 2010.  (First edition 2009. )
 South Shetland Islands: Smith and Low Islands. Scale 1:150000 topographic map No. 13677. British Antarctic Survey, 2009.
 Antarctic Digital Database (ADD). Scale 1:250000 topographic map of Antarctica. Scientific Committee on Antarctic Research (SCAR). Since 1993, regularly upgraded and updated.
 L.L. Ivanov. Antarctica: Livingston Island and Smith Island. Scale 1:100000 topographic map. Manfred Wörner Foundation, 2017.

References
 Slaveykov Peak. SCAR Composite Antarctic Gazetteer
 Bulgarian Antarctic Gazetteer. Antarctic Place-names Commission. (details in Bulgarian, basic data in English)

External links
 Slaveykov Peak. Copernix satellite image

Bulgaria and the Antarctic
Mountains of Smith Island (South Shetland Islands)